Paris O'Brien (also known as Yongli Ouban; born 15 April 2000) is a Canadian-Chinese professional ice hockey player for Kunlun Red Star of the Kontinental Hockey League (KHL).

Playing career
O'Brien was born on 15 April 2000 in Coquitlam, British Columbia, Canada. He was attending South Delta Secondary School when he was recruited by Mike Keenan to join the Kunlun Red Star organization. O'Brien moved to Russia and played nine games in the MHL, Russia’s Junior Hockey League, during the 2017–18 season. He was also selected by Team Latvia's head coach Bob Hartley to be an emergency goaltender for the team during an international tournament. The next season, O’Brien returned to the MHL for 45 games and was also recalled to Kunlun’s minor pro team, KRS-BSU, in the Supreme Hockey League three times.

O'Brien made his international debut for the China men's national ice hockey team at the 2022 Winter Olympics where they placed 12th.

References

External links
 

2000 births
Living people
Canadian emigrants to China
Naturalized citizens of the People's Republic of China
Chinese ice hockey goaltenders
Canadian ice hockey goaltenders
Ice hockey players at the 2022 Winter Olympics
Olympic ice hockey players of China
People from Coquitlam
HC Kunlun Red Star players